Zachary George Roerig  (born February 22, 1985) is an American actor, known for his roles as Casey Hughes on As the World Turns, Hunter Atwood on One Life to Live and Matt Donovan on The Vampire Diaries.

Early life
Roerig was born in Montpelier, Ohio, to Andrea (b. 1963-2020) and Daniel Roerig (1961-2007). He has a younger sister, Emily, who was born in 1989. Roerig attended the Barbizon Modeling and Acting School in Cleveland and went on to participate in the International Modeling and Talent Association where he signed with his late talent manager. He graduated from Montpelier High School where he was both a football player and a wrestler. While he was growing up, Roerig worked for his father and grandfather at Fackler Monuments making gravestones. Shortly after graduating high school, Roerig moved to New York City to pursue his acting career.

Career
Roerig played the role of Casey Hughes on As the World Turns from January 18, 2005 to May 2, 2007. Casey was the son of legacy couple Tom and Margo Hughes and, during his time, Casey was part of a popular couple with Alexandra Chando. After his departure, Roerig accepted a role on the soap One Life to Live, as Hunter Atwood. He departed again later that year. Roerig then made a few appearances on Friday Night Lights as Cash the cowboy. From 2009 to 2017, he portrayed Matt Donovan in The Vampire Diaries. He has made appearances on The Originals as his character, Matt Donovan, on Marvel's The Gifted as Pulse (Augustus), and on the big screen as Carter in Rings. Zach plays young Ray Mott in The Last Full Measure.

Personal life
Roerig has a daughter who was born in January 2011. In June 2013, Roerig filed legal papers in Georgia, seeking full custody of his daughter after her mother, Roerig's ex-girlfriend Alana Turner, was incarcerated in a federal prison. On May 24, 2020, he was arrested for driving under the influence in Montpelier, Ohio, and was arraigned on June 4 of the same year.

Filmography

Film

Television

References

External links

 

1985 births
21st-century American male actors
American male film actors
American male television actors
Living people
Male actors from Ohio
People from Montpelier, Ohio